The 1951 World Table Tennis Championships – Corbillon Cup (women's team) was the 11th edition of the women's team championship. 

Romania won the gold medal defeating Austria 3–1 in the final. England and Wales won bronze medals after finishing second in their respective groups.

Medalists

Final tables

Group A

Brazil withdrew from Group A

Group B

Final

See also
List of World Table Tennis Championships medalists

References

-
1951 in women's table tennis